Flattop Mountain and Flat Top Mountain may refer to

in the United States: